The 2019 Metro Atlantic Athletic Conference women's basketball tournament was the postseason women's basketball tournament for the Metro Atlantic Athletic Conference for the 2018–19 NCAA Division I women's basketball season. It was held March 7–11, 2019, at the Times Union Center in Albany, New York. Top seeded Quinnipiac defeated #3 seed Marist 81–51 for their third straight MAAC Tournament championship.

Seeds
All 11 teams in the conference participated in the Tournament. The top five teams received byes to the quarterfinals. Teams were seeded by record within the conference, with a tiebreaker system to seed teams with identical conference records.

Schedule

Bracket

See also
 2019 MAAC men's basketball tournament

References

MAAC women's basketball tournament
Tournament
MAAC women's basketball tournament
MAAC women's basketball tournament
Women's sports in New York (state)
College basketball tournaments in New York (state)
Basketball competitions in Albany, New York